This article is a list of baseball players who are Cincinnati Reds players that are winners of Major League Baseball awards and recognitions, Reds awards and recognitions, and/or are league leaders in various statistical areas.

Award winners

National League MVP

1938 – Ernie Lombardi
1939 – Bucky Walters
1940 – Frank McCormick
1961 – Frank Robinson
1970 – Johnny Bench
1972 – Johnny Bench
1973 – Pete Rose
1975 – Joe Morgan
1976 – Joe Morgan
1977 – George Foster
1995 – Barry Larkin
2010 – Joey Votto

National League Cy Young

2020 – Trevor Bauer

National League Rookie of the Year
1956 – Frank Robinson
1963 – Pete Rose
1966 – Tommy Helms
1968 – Johnny Bench
1976 – Pat Zachry
1988 – Chris Sabo
1999 – Scott Williamson
2021 – Jonathan India

National League Manager of the Year Award
See footnote
1999 – Jack McKeon

Rawlings Gold Glove Award (NL)

Pitcher
Harvey Haddix (1958)
Bronson Arroyo (2010)
Catcher
Johnny Edwards [2] (1963–64)
Johnny Bench [10] (1968–77) 
Tucker Barnhart [2] (2017, 2020)
First base
Joey Votto (2011)
Second base
Tommy Helms [2] (1970–71)
Joe Morgan [5] (1973–77)
Bret Boone (1998)
Pokey Reese [2] (1999–2000)
Brandon Phillips [4] (2008, 2010–11, 2013)
Third base
Scott Rolen (2010)
Shortstop
Roy McMillan [3] (1957–59)
Leo Cárdenas (1965)
Dave Concepción [5] (1974–77, 1979)
Barry Larkin [3] (1994–96)
Outfield
Frank Robinson (1958)
Vada Pinson (1961)
Pete Rose [2] (1969–70)
Cesar Geronimo [4] (1974–77)
Eric Davis [3] (1987–89)

Wilson Defensive Player of the Year Award

See explanatory note at Atlanta Braves award winners and league leaders.
Team (all positions)
Brandon Phillips (2012)
Jay Bruce (2013)
Pitcher (in MLB)
Johnny Cueto (2014)

Silver Slugger Award (NL)

Pitcher
Catcher
First base
Second base
Joe Morgan (1982)
Brandon Phillips (2011)
Third base
Shortstop
Dave Concepción [2] (1981–82)
Barry Larkin [9] (1988–92, 1995–96, 1998–99)
Felipe López (2005)
Outfield
George Foster (1981)
Dave Parker [2] (1985–86)
Eric Davis [2] (1987, 1989)
Jay Bruce [2] (2012–13)

National League Hank Aaron Award
2010 – Joey Votto

National League Rolaids Relief Man Award
1976 – Rawly Eastwick
1988 – John Franco
1996 – Jeff Brantley
1997 – Jeff Shaw

MLB "This Year in Baseball Awards"

Note: These awards were renamed the "GIBBY Awards" in 2010 and then the "Esurance MLB Awards" in 2015.

"GIBBY Awards" Best Bounceback Player
 – Johnny Cueto

Triple Crown Winner (pitching)
1939 – Bucky Walters

All-Star Game MVP Award
Note: This was re-named the Ted Williams Most Valuable Player Award in 2002.

1967 – Tony Pérez
1972 – Joe Morgan
1976 – George Foster
1980 – Ken Griffey, Sr.
1982 – Dave Concepción

MLB All-Century Team
 Johnny Bench – catcher
 Pete Rose – outfielder

DHL Hometown Heroes (2006)
Pete Rose — voted by MLB fans as the most outstanding player in the history of the franchise, based on on-field performance, leadership quality and character value

MLB All-Time Team (Baseball Writers' Association of America)
 Johnny Bench – catcher (first team)
 Joe Morgan – second base (second team/runner-up)

Baseball Prospectus Internet Baseball Awards NL Most Valuable Player
See: Baseball Prospectus#Internet Baseball Awards
2010 – Joey Votto

USA Today NL Most Valuable Player
2010 – Joey Votto

Topps All-Star Rookie teams

1959 Jim O'Toole (left-handed pitcher)
1963 Pete Rose (second base) & Tommy Harper (outfield)
1964 Bill McCool (left-handed pitcher)
1965 Tony Pérez (first base)
1966 Tommy Helms (third base)
1967 Lee May (first base)
1968 Johnny Bench (catcher)
1970 Bernie Carbo (outfield)
1971 Ross Grimsley (left-handed pitcher)
1973 Dan Driessen (third base)
1980 Ron Oester (shortstop)
1981 Bruce Berenyi (right-handed pitcher)
1983 Nick Esasky (third base)
1985 Tom Browning (left-handed pitcher)
1988 Chris Sabo (third base)
1990 Hal Morris (first base)
1992 Reggie Sanders (outfield)
2001 Adam Dunn (outfield)
2002 Austin Kearns (outfield)
2008 Joey Votto (first base) & Jay Bruce (outfield)
2012 Zack Cozart (shortstop) & Todd Frazier (third base)
2014 Billy Hamilton (outfield)

 Note: In 2000, Ken Griffey Jr., at the time an outfielder for the Reds, was one of ten former Topps All-Star Rookies who were featured in a 40th anniversary "special card insert set" put in all of the regular issues of 2000 Topps All-Star Rookie Team sets. Each of the ten cards featured a current player who was a former Topps All-Star Rookie at their position, and on the back of the card was a list of all the Topps All-Star Rookies who were named at that position.

USA Today Manager of the Year
See footnote
2010 – Dusty Baker

Team championship awards
The Reds were National League Champions and/or World Series Champions in more than just these seasons. However, Major League Baseball did not start awarding the NLCS trophy until 1969, and did not start issuing a World Series trophy until 1967. For the Reds' earlier N.L. pennants and World Series championships, see the team's "Awards and achievements" navigation box.

 – National League Championship Series Trophy
 – National League Championship Series Trophy
 – World Series Trophy
 – World Series Trophy
 – Warren Giles Trophy (National League champion)
 – Commissioner's Trophy (World Series)

Other team awards
 – Baseball America Organization of the Year
 – Wilson Defensive Team of the Year

Team records (single-season and career)

Other achievements

Cincinnati Reds Players in the National Baseball Hall of Fame
See:

Players in the Cincinnati Reds Hall of Fame

Cincinnati Reds' Team Most Valuable Player (Cincinnati chapter of Baseball Writers' Association of America (BBWAA))

Cincinnati Reds' Team Pitcher of the Year (Cincinnati chapter of BBWAA)
See: Cincinnati Reds Hall of Fame

Cincinnati Reds retired numbers
See: 

1 – Fred Hutchinson
5 – Johnny Bench
8 – Joe Morgan
10 – Sparky Anderson
11 – Barry Larkin
13 – Dave Concepción
14 – Pete Rose
18 – Ted Kluszewski
20 – Frank Robinson
24 – Tony Pérez
42 – Jackie Robinson (retired throughout all of professional baseball on April 15, 1997)

Sporting News Sportsman of the Year

1985 – Pete Rose

Hickok Belt
See footnote

1975 – Pete Rose

Fastest Pitch Ever Recorded
 On September 24, 2010 against the San Diego Padres, Aroldis Chapman was clocked at 105.1 mph, according to pitch f/x, which makes it the fastest pitch ever recorded in Major League Baseball.

National League Statistical Leaders

Batting

Batting average

1905 – Cy Seymour (.377)
1916 – Hal Chase (.339)
1917 – Edd Roush (.341)
1919 – Edd Roush (.321)
1926 – Bubbles Hargrave (.353)
1938 – Ernie Lombardi (.342)
1968 – Pete Rose (.335)
1969 – Pete Rose (.348)
1973 – Pete Rose (.338)

On-base percentage

1917 – Heinie Groh (.385)
1918 – Heinie Groh (.395)
1926 – Cuckoo Christensen (.426)
1962 – Frank Robinson (.421)
1968 – Pete Rose (.391)
1972 – Joe Morgan (.417)
1974 – Joe Morgan (.427)
1975 – Joe Morgan (.466)
1976 – Joe Morgan (.444)
1988 – Kal Daniels (.397)
2010 – Joey Votto (.424)
2011 – Joey Votto (.416)
2013 – Joey Votto (.435)
2016 – Joey Votto (.434)
2017 – Joey Votto (.454)

Slugging percentage

1905 – Cy Seymour (.559)
1918 – Edd Roush (.455)
1960 – Frank Robinson (.595)
1961 – Frank Robinson (.611)
1962 – Frank Robinson (.624)
1976 – Joe Morgan (.576)
1977 – George Foster (.631)
2010 – Joey Votto (.600)

OPS

1905 – Cy Seymour (.988)
1918 – Edd Roush (.823)
1919 – Heinie Groh (.823)
1960 – Frank Robinson (1.002)
1961 – Frank Robinson (1.015)
1962 – Frank Robinson (1.015)
1975  -Joe Morgan (.974)
1976 – Joe Morgan (1.020)
1977 – George Foster (1.013)
2010 – Joey Votto (1.024)

Games

1907 – Miller Huggins (156)
1911 – Dick Hoblitzel (158)
1915 – Tommy Griffith (160)
1915 – Heinie Groh (160)
1917 – Heinie Groh (156)
1919 – Jake Daubert (140)
1922 – George Burns (156)
1922 – Jake Daubert (156)
1922 – Babe Pinelli (156)
1923 – George Burns (154)
1952 – Bobby Adams (154)
1952 – Roy McMillan (154)
1954 – Roy McMillan (154)
1955 – Gus Bell (154)
1955 – Wally Post (154)
1963 – Vada Pinson (162)
1964 – Leo Cárdenas (163)
1972 – Pete Rose (154)
1974 – Pete Rose (163)
1975 – Pete Rose (162)
1977 – Pete Rose (162)
1986 – Dave Parker (162)
2002 – Aaron Boone (162)
2013 – Joey Votto (162)
2017 – Joey Votto (162)

At bats

1910 – Dick Hoblitzel (611)
1911 – Dick Hoblitzel (622)
1917 – Hal Chase (602)
1938 – Frank McCormick (640)
1940 – Frank McCormick (618)
1944 – Woody Williams (653)
1945 – Dain Clay (656)
1952 – Bobby Adams (637)
1956 – Johnny Temple (632)
1959 – Vada Pinson (648)
1960 – Vada Pinson (652)
1965 – Pete Rose (670)
1972 – Pete Rose (645)
1973 – Pete Rose (680)
1977 – Pete Rose (655)
1989 – Todd Benzinger (628)
2015 – Todd Frazier (619)

Plate appearances

1911 – Bob Bescher (716)
1917 – Heinie Groh (685)
1923 – George Burns (724)
1944 – Woody Williams (707)
1947 – Frank Baumholtz (711)
1955 – Ted Kluszewski (686)
1959 – Vada Pinson (706)
1960 – Vada Pinson (706)
1965 – Pete Rose (757)
1972 – Pete Rose (729)
1973 – Pete Rose (752)
1974 – Pete Rose (770)
1976 – Pete Rose (759)
1977 – Pete Rose (731)
1978 – Pete Rose (729)
2013 – Joey Votto (726)

Runs

1912 – Bob Bescher (120)
1918 – Heinie Groh (86)
1939 – Billy Werber (115)
1956 – Frank Robinson (122)
1959 – Vada Pinson (131)
1962 – Frank Robinson (134)
1965 – Tommy Harper (126)
1972 – Joe Morgan (122)
1974 – Pete Rose (110)
1975 – Pete Rose (112)
1976 – Pete Rose (130)
1977 – George Foster (124)

Hits

1905 – Cy Seymour (219)
1916 – Hal Chase (184)
1917 – Heinie Groh (182)
1938 – Frank McCormick (209)
1939 – Frank McCormick (209)
1940 – Frank McCormick (191)
1955 – Ted Kluszewski (192)
1961 – Vada Pinson (208)
1963 – Vada Pinson (204)
1965 – Pete Rose (209)
1968 – Pete Rose (210)
1970 – Pete Rose (205)
1972 – Pete Rose (198)
1973 – Pete Rose (230)
1976 – Pete Rose (215)

Total bases

1902 – Sam Crawford (256)
1905 – Cy Seymour (325)
1974 – Johnny Bench (315)
1977 – George Foster (388)
1985 – Dave Parker (350)
1986 – Dave Parker (304)

Doubles

1903 – Harry Steinfeldt (32)
1905 – Cy Seymour (40)
1917 – Heinie Groh (39)
1918 – Heinie Groh (28)
1923 – Edd Roush (41)
1940 – Frank McCormick (44)
1947 – Eddie Miller (38)
1957 – Don Hoak (39)
1959 – Vada Pinson (47)
1960 – Vada Pinson (37)
1962 – Frank Robinson (51)
1974 – Pete Rose (45)
1975 – Pete Rose (47)
1976 – Pete Rose (42)
1978 – Pete Rose (51)
1985 – Dave Parker (42)
2011 – Joey Votto (40)

Triples

1890 – John Reilly (26)
1902 – Sam Crawford (22)
1905 – Cy Seymour (21)
1907 – John Ganzel (16)
1909 – Mike Mitchell (17)
1910 – Mike Mitchell (18)
1922 – Jake Daubert (22)
1924 – Edd Roush (21)
1932 – Babe Herman (19)
1935 – Ival Goodman (18)
1936 – Ival Goodman (14)
1963 – Vada Pinson (14)
1967 – Vada Pinson (13)
1990 – Mariano Duncan (11)

Home runs

1892 – Bug Holliday (13)
1901 – Sam Crawford (16)
1905 – Fred Odwell (9)
1954 – Ted Kluszewski (49)
1970 – Johnny Bench (45)
1972 – Johnny Bench (40)
1977 – George Foster (52)
1978 – George Foster (40)

RBI

1905 – Cy Seymour (121)
1918 – Sherry Magee (76)
1939 – Frank McCormick (128)
1954 – Ted Kluszewski (141)
1965 – Deron Johnson (130)
1970 – Johnny Bench (148)
1972 – Johnny Bench (125)
1974 – Johnny Bench (129)
1976 – George Foster (121)
1977 – George Foster (149)
1978 – George Foster (120)
1985 – Dave Parker (125)

Walks

1905 – Miller Huggins (103)
1907 – Miller Huggins (83)
1913 – Bob Bescher (94)
1916 – Heinie Groh (84)
1923 – George Burns (101)
1957 – Johnny Temple (94)
1972 – Joe Morgan (115)
1975 – Joe Morgan (132)
1980 – Dan Driessen (93)
2011 – Joey Votto (110)
2012 – Joey Votto (94)
2013 – Joey Votto (135)
2015 – Joey Votto (143)
2017 – Joey Votto (134)

Strikeouts

1911 – Bob Bescher (78)
1931 – Nick Cullop (86)
1948 – Hank Sauer (85)
1955 – Wally Post (102)
1956 – Wally Post (124)
1994 – Reggie Sanders (114)
2004 – Adam Dunn (195)
2005 – Adam Dunn (168)
2006 – Adam Dunn (194)

Stolen bases

1909 – Bob Bescher (54)
1910 – Bob Bescher (70)
1911 – Bob Bescher (81)
1912 – Bob Bescher (67)
1940 – Lonny Frey (22)
1970 – Bobby Tolan (57)

Singles

1906 – Miller Huggins (141)
1917 – Edd Roush (141)
1938 – Frank McCormick (160)
1952 – Bobby Adams (145)
1956 – Johnny Temple (157)
1961 – Vada Pinson (150)
1973 – Pete Rose (181)

Runs created

1902 – Sam Crawford (99)
1905 – Cy Seymour (139)
1918 – Heinie Groh (76)
1962 – Frank Robinson (158)
1968 – Pete Rose (115)
1976 – Joe Morgan (123)
1977 – George Foster (148)
2010 – Joey Votto (144)
2013 – Joey Votto (132)
2016 – Joey Votto (139)

Extra-base hits

1905 – Cy Seymour (69)
1962 – Frank Robinson (92)
1970 – Johnny Bench (84)
1974 – Johnny Bench (73)
1977 – George Foster (85)
1985 – Dave Parker (80)

Times on base

1917 – Heinie Groh (261)
1918 – Heinie Groh (219)
1965 – Pete Rose (286)
1968 – Pete Rose (270)
1969 – Pete Rose (311)
1972 – Joe Morgan (282)
1973 – Pete Rose (301)
1974 – Pete Rose (296)
1975 – Pete Rose (310)
1976 – Pete Rose (307)

Hit by pitch

1914 – Heinie Groh (13)
1915 – Red Killefer (19)
1923 – Bubbles Hargrave (12)
1936 – Ival Goodman (9)
1938 – Ival Goodman (15)
1939 – Ival Goodman (7)
1956 – Frank Robinson (20)
1959 – Frank Robinson (8)
1960 – Frank Robinson (9)
1962 – Frank Robinson (11)
1963 – Frank Robinson (14)
1965 – Frank Robinson (18)
1980 – Dan Driessen (6)
2013 – Shin Soo Choo (26)

Sacrifice hits

1896 – Dummy Hoy (33)
1918 – Edd Roush (33)
1919 – Jake Daubert (39)
1924 – Babe Pinelli (33)
1925 – Babe Pinelli (34)
1939 – Lonny Frey (25)
1940 – Mike McCormick (20)
1954 – Roy McMillan (31)
1957 – Johnny Temple (16)
1958 – Johnny Temple (17)
1969 – Jim Merritt (15)
2012 – Johnny Cueto (17)

Sacrifice flies

1959 – Johnny Temple (13)
1961 – Frank Robinson (10)
1965 – Deron Johnson (10)
1970 – Johnny Bench (11)
1972 – Johnny Bench (12)
1973 – Johnny Bench (10)
1976 – Joe Morgan (12)

Intentional walks

1955 – Ted Kluszewski (25)
1961 – Frank Robinson (23)
1962 – Frank Robinson (16)
1963 – Frank Robinson (20)
1964 – Frank Robinson (20)
1965 – Leo Cárdenas (25)
1966 – Leo Cárdenas (18)
1972 – Johnny Bench (23)
1985 – Dave Parker (24)
2012 – Joey Votto (18)
2013 – Joey Votto (19)
2017 – Joey Votto (20)

Grounded into double plays

1933 – Ernie Lombardi (26)
1934 – Ernie Lombardi (24)
1938 – Ernie Lombardi (30)
1940 – Frank McCormick (23)
1941 – Frank McCormick (22)
1980 – Ray Knight (24)
1981 – Ray Knight (18)
1983 – Dave Concepción (21)
1985 – Dave Parker (26)
2005 – Sean Casey (27)

Caught stealing

1921 – Sam Bohne (22)
1925 – Edd Roush (20)
1970 – Bobby Tolan (20)
2014 – Billy Hamilton (23)

At bats per strikeout

1910 – Hans Lobert (34.9)
1917 – Ivey Wingo (30.7)
1918 – Edd Roush (43.5)
1921 – Edd Roush (52.2)
1931 – Edd Roush (75.2)
1935 – Ernie Lombardi (55.3)
1941 – Frank McCormick (46.4)
1988 – Barry Larkin (24.5)
2008 – Jeff Keppinger (19.1)

At bats per home run

1892 – Bug Holliday (46.3)
1901 – Sam Crawford (32.2)
1905 – Fred Odwell (52)
1954 – Ted Kluszewski (11.7)
1977 – George Foster (11.8)
1978 – George Foster (15.1)

Outs

1898 – Tommy Corcoran (481)
1907 – Miller Huggins (449)
1910 – Dick Hoblitzel (459)
1911 – Dick Hoblitzel (464)
1917 – Larry Kopf (450)
1926 – Hughie Critz (467)
1934 – Mark Koenig (491)
1940 – Frank McCormick (451)
1944 – Woody Williams (513)
1945 – Dain Clay (487)
1952 – Bobby Adams (489)
1960 – Vada Pinson (490)
1986 – Dave Parker (493)
1989 – Todd Benzinger (498)

Pitching

ERA

1890 – Billy Rhines (1.95)
1896 – Billy Rhines (2.45)
1923 – Dolf Luque (1.93)
1925 – Dolf Luque (2.63)
1939 – Bucky Walters (2.29)
1940 – Bucky Walters (2.48)
1941 – Elmer Riddle (2.24)
1944 – Ed Heusser (2.38)
2020 – Trevor Bauer (1.73)

Wins

1922 – Eppa Rixey (25)
1923 – Dolf Luque (27)
1926 – Pete Donohue (20)
1939 – Bucky Walters (27)
1940 – Bucky Walters (22)
1943 – Elmer Riddle (21)
1944 – Bucky Walters (23)
1947 – Ewell Blackwell (22)
1961 – Joey Jay (21)
1981 – Tom Seaver (14)
1988 – Danny Jackson (23)
2006 – Aaron Harang (16)

Win–loss %

1892 – Mike Sullivan (.750)
1919 – Dolf Luque (.769)
1923 – Dolf Luque (.771)
1939 – Paul Derringer (.781)
1941 – Elmer Riddle (.826)
1943 – Clyde Shoun (.737)
1962 – Bob Purkey (.821)
1970 – Wayne Simpson (.824)
1972 – Gary Nolan (.750)
1981 – Tom Seaver (.875)
1991 – José Rijo (.714)

WHIP

1890 – Billy Rhines (1.121)
1896 – Billy Rhines (1.231)
1925 – Dolf Luque (1.172)
1929 – Red Lucas (1.204)
1939 – Bucky Walters (1.125)
1940 – Bucky Walters (1.092)
1951 – Ken Raffensberger (1.086)
1982 – Mario Soto (1.060)
1991 – José Rijo (1.077)
2020 – Trevor Bauer (0.795)

Hits allowed/9IP

1892 – Tony Mullane (6.77)
1896 – Billy Rhines (8.06)
1920 – Dolf Luque (7.28)
1923 – Dolf Luque (7.80)
1925 – Dolf Luque (8.13)
1929 – Red Lucas (8.90)
1938 – Johnny Vander Meer (7.07)
1939 – Bucky Walters (7.05)
1940 – Bucky Walters (7.11)
1941 – Johnny Vander Meer (6.84)
1944 – Bucky Walters (7.36)
1950 – Ewell Blackwell (7.00)
1970 – Wayne Simpson (6.39)
1980 – Mario Soto (5.96)

Walks/9IP

1904 – Noodles Hahn (1.06)
1910 – George Suggs (1.62)
1924 – Rube Benton (1.33)
1926 – Pete Donohue (1.23)
1933 – Red Lucas (.74)
1939 – Paul Derringer (1.05)
1940 – Paul Derringer (1.46)
1950 – Ken Raffensberger (1.51)
1951 – Ken Raffensberger (1.38)
1959 – Don Newcombe (1.09)
1967 – Milt Pappas (1.57)
1975 – Gary Nolan (1.24)
1976 – Gary Nolan (1.02)

Strikeouts/9IP

1919 – Hod Eller (4.97)
1941 – Johnny Vander Meer (8.03)
1942 – Johnny Vander Meer (6.86)
1943 – Johnny Vander Meer (5.42)
1947 – Ewell Blackwell (6.36)
1950 – Ewell Blackwell (6.48)
1963 – Jim Maloney (9.53)
1967 – Gary Nolan (8.18)
1980 – Mario Soto (8.61)
1982 – Mario Soto (9.57)
1993 – José Rijo (7.94)

Games

1912 – Rube Benton (50)
1936 – Paul Derringer (51)
1948 – Harry Gumbert (61)
1967 – Ted Abernathy (70)
1968 – Ted Abernathy (78)
1969 – Wayne Granger (90)
1971 – Wayne Granger (70)
1984 – Ted Power (78)
1988 – Rob Murphy (76)

Saves

1893 – Frank Dwyer (2)
1895 – Tom Parrott (3)
1910 – Harry Gaspar (7)
1914 – Red Ames (6)
1924 – Jakie May (6)
1940 – Joe Beggs (7)
1948 – Harry Gumbert (17)
1967 – Ted Abernathy (28)
1970 – Wayne Granger (35)
1972 – Clay Carroll (37)
1975 – Rawly Eastwick (22)
1976 – Rawly Eastwick (26)
1988 – John Franco (39)
1996 – Jeff Brantley (44)
1997 – Jeff Shaw (42)

Innings

1901 – Noodles Hahn
1922 – Eppa Rixey
1925 – Pete Donohue (301)
1926 – Pete Donohue
1938 – Paul Derringer (307)
1939 – Bucky Walters (319)
1940 – Bucky Walters (305)
1941 – Bucky Walters (302)
1973 – Jack Billingham
2006 – Bronson Arroyo

Strikeouts

1899 – Noodles Hahn (145)
1900 – Noodles Hahn (132)
1901 – Noodles Hahn (239)
1939 – Bucky Walters (137)
1941 – Johnny Vander Meer (202)
1942 – Johnny Vander Meer (186)
1943 – Johnny Vander Meer (174)
1947 – Ewell Blackwell (193)
1993 – José Rijo (227)
2006 – Aaron Harang (216)
2014 – Johnny Cueto (242)

Games started

1912 – Rube Benton (39)
1922 – Eppa Rixey (38)
1925 – Pete Donohue (38)
1926 – Pete Donohue (38)
1928 – Eppa Rixey (37)
1936 – Paul Derringer (37)
1938 – Paul Derringer (37)
1939 – Bucky Walters (36)
1940 – Paul Derringer (37)
1943 – Johnny Vander Meer (36)
1949 – Ken Raffensberger (38)
1973 – Jack Billingham (40)
1981 – Mario Soto (25)
1986 – Tom Browning (39)
1988 – Tom Browning (36)
1989 – Tom Browning (37)
1990 – Tom Browning (35)
1993 – José Rijo (36)
1994 – José Rijo (36)
2006 – Bronson Arroyo (35)
2006 – Aaron Harang (35)
2012 – Johnny Cueto (33)
2014 – Johnny Cueto (34)

Complete games

1901 – Noodles Hahn (41)
1925 – Pete Donohue (27)
1926 – Carl Mays (24)
1929 – Red Lucas (28)
1931 – Red Lucas (24)
1932 – Red Lucas (28)
1938 – Paul Derringer (26)
1939 – Bucky Walters (31)
1940 – Bucky Walters (29)
1941 – Bucky Walters (27)
1947 – Ewell Blackwell (23)
1983 – Mario Soto (18)
1984 – Mario Soto (13)
1988 – Danny Jackson (15)
2006 – Aaron Harang (6)
2020 – Trevor Bauer (2)

Shutouts

1900 – Noodles Hahn (4)
1921 – Dolf Luque (3)
1923 – Dolf Luque (6)
1924 – Eppa Rixey (4)
1925 – Dolf Luque (4)
1926 – Pete Donohue (5)
1928 – Red Lucas (4)
1937 – Lee Grissom (5)
1946 – Ewell Blackwell (5)
1949 – Ken Raffensberger (5)
1952 – Ken Raffensberger (6)
1955 – Joe Nuxhall (5)
1961 – Joey Jay (4)
1966 – Jim Maloney (5)
1973 – Jack Billingham (7)
1979 – Tom Seaver (5)
2009 – Bronson Arroyo (2)
2020 – Trevor Bauer (2)

Home runs allowed

1894 – Frank Dwyer (27)
1950 – Ken Raffensberger (34)
1960 – Jay Hook (31)
1966 – Sammy Ellis (35)
1969 – Jim Merritt (33)
1976 – Gary Nolan (28)
1981 – Mario Soto (13)
1983 – Mario Soto (28)
1985 – Mario Soto (30)
1988 – Tom Browning (36)
1989 – Tom Browning (31)
1991 – Tom Browning (32)
2005 – Eric Milton (40)

Walks allowed

1915 – Gene Dale (107)
1917 – Pete Schneider (117)
1918 – Pete Schneider (117)
1943 – Johnny Vander Meer (162)
1948 – Johnny Vander Meer (124)
1949 – Herm Wehmeier (117)
1950 – Herm Wehmeier (135)
1952 – Herm Wehmeier (103)
1981 – Bruce Berenyi (77)

Hits Allowed

1912 – George Suggs (320)
1922 – Eppa Rixey (337)
1926 – Pete Donohue (298)
1928 – Eppa Rixey (317)
1936 – Paul Derringer (331)
1938 – Paul Derringer (315)
1939 – Paul Derringer (321)
1941 – Bucky Walters (292)
1949 – Ken Raffensberger (289)
1989 – Rick Mahler (242)

Strikeout to walk

1901 – Noodles Hahn (3.46)
1939 – Paul Derringer (3.66)
1947 – Ewell Blackwell (2.03)
1958 – Harvey Haddix (2.56)
1976 – Gary Nolan (4.19)
1982 – Mario Soto (3.86)

Losses

1914 – Red Ames (23)
1915 – Pete Schneider (19)
1922 – Dolf Luque (23)
1930 – Benny Frey (18)
1931 – Si Johnson (19)
1932 – Ownie Carroll (19)
1934 – Si Johnson (22)
1949 – Howie Fox (19)
1951 – Ken Raffensberger (17)
1951 – Willie Ramsdell (17)
1982 – Bruce Berenyi (18)
1984 – Jeff Russell (18)

Earned runs allowed

1901 – Bill Phillips (145)
1918 – Pete Schneider (85)
1934 – Si Johnson (125)
1936 – Paul Derringer (126)
1950 – Herm Wehmeier (145)
1965 – Sammy Ellis (111)
1966 – Sammy Ellis (130)
1969 – Jim Merritt (122)
1991 – Tom Browning (107)
1992 – Tim Belcher (99)
2005 – Eric Milton (134)

Wild pitches

1900 – Ed Scott (11)
1904 – Jack Harper (12)
1927 – Jakie May (8)
1943 – Bucky Walters (8)
1949 – Herm Wehmeier (7)
1950 – Ewell Blackwell (11)
1950 – Herm Wehmeier (11)
1951 – Willie Ramsdell (9)
1963 – Jim Maloney (19)
1969 – Jim Maloney (16)
1997 – Mike Remlinger (12)
2007 – Aaron Harang (12)

Hit batsmen

1904 – Tom Walker (18)
1907 – Jake Weimer (23)
1910 – Harry Gaspar (15)
1911 – Art Fromme (16)
1912 – Rube Benton (18)
1927 – Jakie May (14)
1932 – Ownie Carroll (9)
1948 – Kent Peterson (6)
1950 – Ewell Blackwell (13)
1951 – Ewell Blackwell (9)
1952 – Frank Smith (7)
1952 – Herm Wehmeier (7)
1956 – Johnny Klippstein (10)
1962 – Bob Purkey (14)
1968 – George Culver (14)
1977 – Jack Billingham (10)
1989 – Rick Mahler (10)
2008 – Johnny Cueto (14)
2008 – Edinson Vólquez (14)

Batters faced

1912 – Rube Benton (1,302)
1922 – Eppa Rixey (1,303)
1926 – Pete Donohue (1,191)
1938 – Paul Derringer (1,263)
1939 – Bucky Walters (1,283)
1940 – Bucky Walters (1,207)
2006 – Aaron Harang (993)

Games finished

1896 – Chauncey Fisher (11)
1897 – Red Ehret (11)
1898 – Bill Dammann (13)
1905 – Charlie Chech (13)
1917 – Hod Eller (21)
1924 – Jakie May (21)
1940 – Joe Beggs (27)
1948 – Harry Gumbert (46)
1956 – Hersh Freeman (47)
1967 – Ted Abernathy (61)
1969 – Wayne Granger (55)
1970 – Wayne Granger (59)
1980 – Tom Hume (62)
1987 – John Franco (60)
1988 – John Franco (61)
2007 – David Weathers (60)

See also
Arizona Fall League#Stenson Award
Baseball awards
Baseball statistics
List of MLB awards

Footnotes

Awa
Major League Baseball team trophies and awards